Jacob Erdman (February 22, 1801 – July 20, 1867) was a Democratic member of the U.S. House of Representatives from Pennsylvania.

Biography
Jacob Erdman (grandfather of Constantine Jacob Erdman) was born in Coopersburg, Pennsylvania.  He was a member of the Pennsylvania House of Representatives from 1834 to 1836.

Erdman was elected as a Democrat to the Twenty-ninth Congress.  He was an unsuccessful candidate for reelection in 1846.  He was elected associate judge of Lehigh County Court on November 9, 1866 and served until his death in Coopersburg, Pennsylvania, He is interred in Blue Church Cemetery near Coopersburg.

Sources

1801 births
1867 deaths
Democratic Party members of the Pennsylvania House of Representatives
Pennsylvania state court judges
People from Lehigh County, Pennsylvania
Democratic Party members of the United States House of Representatives from Pennsylvania
19th-century American politicians
19th-century American judges